Europa Cup may refer to:

Alpine Skiing Europa Cup, an international circuit of alpine skiing competitions
IIHF European Champions Cup, International Hockey Federation
IIHF European Women's Champions Cup, a European competition of Women's Ice Hockey clubs
Korfball Europa Cup
Alpine Elf Europa Cup, a European auto racing championship

See also
European Cup (disambiguation)
European Cup for football
European Rugby Champions Cup
UEFA Europa League, an annual football club competition